Aristotelia modulatrix is a moth of the family Gelechiidae. It was described by Edward Meyrick in 1938. It is found in North Kivu of the Democratic Republic of the Congo.

References

Moths described in 1938
Aristotelia (moth)
Moths of Africa